Lewaigue Halt (Manx: Stadd Lewaigue) is an intermediate stopping place on the northern section of the Manx Electric Railway on the Isle of Man.

Location
The stop can be found between Ballajora Station and 'Belle Vue (For Port-E-Vullen)'.  The poles bearing the overhead lines on the line are numbered from Derby Castle, the railway's southern terminus, and Lewaigue Halt can be found between pole numbers 811 and 812.   The halt is located on Jack's Lane (designated C13) in the hamlet of Lewaigue.

Usage
The stop is widely used by The Venture Centre, a nearby outdoor pursuits centre. The stop consists of a waiting shelter for passengers, erected in 1987. The former corrugated iron shelter was demolished in 1986 after vandalism.

Also
Manx Electric Railway Stations

References

Sources
 Manx Electric Railway Stopping Places (2002) Manx Electric Railway Society
 Island Images: Manx Electric Railway Pages (2003) Jon Wornham
 Official Tourist Department Page (2009) Isle Of Man Heritage Railways

Railway stations in the Isle of Man
Manx Electric Railway
Railway stations opened in 1899